Cheshire West and Chester Council is the local authority of Cheshire West and Chester. It is a unitary authority, having the powers of a non-metropolitan county and district council combined. It provides a full range of local government services including Council Tax billing, libraries, social services, processing planning applications, waste collection and disposal, and it is a local education authority. The council was first elected on 1 May 2008, a year before coming into its legal powers on 1 April 2009. After an election in May 2019, no party holds overall control.

Powers and functions
The local authority derives its powers and functions from the Local Government Act 1972 and subsequent legislation. It has a 'general power of competence' as described in the Localism Act 2011, i.e. it is permitted to act in any manner whatsoever which is not unlawful. For the purposes of local government, Cheshire West and Chester is one of the fifty-five unitary authorities in England. This means that  is the only principal authority in its territorial jurisdiction, and it has the statutory powers and functions of both a non-metropolitan county and a non-metropolitan district council. The only exceptions to this are the fire and police services, which are still provided on a Cheshire-wide basis by joint boards composed of elected councillors and are funded by a Council Tax precept. Conversely, it is unnecessary for Cheshire West and Chester Council to set a precept for itself as it is also a billing authority.

Premises
When created in 2009, the council inherited several administrative buildings from its predecessors, notably including Chester Town Hall and the adjoining offices at The Forum from Chester City Council, the Council Offices at 4 Civic Way in Ellesmere Port from Ellesmere Port and Neston Borough Council, and Wyvern House on The Drumber in Winsford from Vale Royal Borough Council. The abolished Cheshire County Council's former headquarters at County Hall passed jointly to both Cheshire West and Chester Council and its neighbour Cheshire East Council. County Hall was sold to the University of Chester in 2010, and Cheshire West and Chester Council moved its main offices to a new building called HQ Chester at 58 Nicholas Street in Chester, whilst retaining the other buildings as local offices and additional accommodation.

The HQ Chester building did not contain a council chamber, and most full council meetings were held at Wyvern House in Winsford, except the annual council meeting which was usually held at Chester Town Hall. Committee meetings were held at various venues. This pattern continued until March 2020 when in-person meetings were suspended due to the COVID-19 pandemic. Since the resumption of in-person meetings in May 2021, most committee meetings have been held at Ellesmere Port Library, whilst larger venues have been hired for full council meetings. In 2022 the council moved its main offices to a new building called The Portal on Wellington Road in Ellesmere Port (opposite the library), and vacated most of the space it had formerly occupied at HQ Chester.

Political control

Since the 2019 election election the council has been under no overall control, with Louise Gittins of Labour serving as leader of the council. The next election is due in 2023.

Council seats since 2008

Cabinet 

Source:

Councillors

Notes

References

Leader and cabinet executives
Unitary authority councils of England
Local education authorities in England
Local authorities in Cheshire
Billing authorities in England
2009 establishments in England
Cheshire West and Chester